The Bantamweight class in the boxing at the 1996 Summer Olympics competition was the third-lightest class at the 1996 Summer Olympics in Atlanta, Georgia. The weight class is open for boxers up from 54 kilograms. The competition in the Alexander Memorial Coliseum started on 1996-07-20 and ended on 1996-08-03.

Medalists

Results

References

External links
amateur-boxing

Bantamweight